Abu Alayej may refer to:
 Abu Alayej-e Olya
 Abu Alayej-e Sofla
 Abu Alayej-e Vosta